A fraternity (from Latin frater: "brother"; whence, "brotherhood") or fraternal organization is an organization, society, club or fraternal order traditionally of men associated together for various religious or secular aims. Fraternity in the Western concept developed in the Christian context, notably with the religious orders in the Catholic Church during the Middle Ages. The concept was eventually further extended with medieval confraternities and guilds. In the early modern era, these were followed by fraternal orders such as Freemasons and Odd Fellows, along with gentlemen's clubs, student fraternities, and fraternal service organizations. Members are occasionally referred to as a brother or – usually in a religious context – Frater or Friar.

Today, connotations of fraternities vary according to context including companionships and brotherhoods dedicated to the religious, intellectual, academic, physical, or social pursuits of its members. Additionally, in modern times, it sometimes connotes a secret society especially regarding freemasonry, odd fellows, various academic, and student societies.

Although membership in fraternities was and mostly still is limited to men, this is not always the case. There are mixed male and female orders, as well as wholly female religious orders and societies, some of which are known as sororities in North America. Notable modern fraternities or fraternal orders include some grand lodges operating among freemasons and odd fellows.

History

There are known fraternal organizations which existed as far back as ancient clan hero and goddess cults of Greek religions and in the Mithraic Mysteries of ancient Rome.

The background of the modern world of fraternities can be traced back to the confraternities in the Middle Ages, which were formed as lay organisations affiliated with the Catholic Church. Some were groups of men and women who were endeavoring to ally themselves more closely with the prayer and activity of the church; others were groups of tradesmen, which are more commonly referred to as guilds. These later confraternities evolved into purely secular fraternal societies, while the ones with religious goals continue to be the format of the modern Third Orders affiliated with the mendicant orders. Other yet took the shape as military orders during the Crusades, which later provided inspiration for elements of quite a few modern fraternal orders.

The development of modern fraternal orders was especially dynamic in the United States, where the freedom to associate outside governmental regulation is expressly sanctioned in law. There have been hundreds of fraternal organizations in the United States, and at the beginning of the 20th century the number of memberships equaled the number of adult males. (Due to multiple memberships, probably only 50% of adult males belonged to any organizations.) This led to the period being referred to as "the Golden age of fraternalism." In 1944 Arthur M. Schlesinger coined the phrase "a nation of joiners" to refer to the phenomenon. Alexis de Tocqueville also referred to the American reliance on private organization in the 1830s in Democracy in America.

There are many attributes that fraternities may or may not have, depending on their structure and purpose. Fraternities can have differing degrees of secrecy, some form of initiation or ceremony marking admission, formal codes of behavior, dress codes disciplinary procedures, very differing amounts of real property and assets.

Types

The only true distinction between a fraternity and any other form of social organizations is the implication that the members are freely associated as equals for a mutually beneficial purpose rather than because of a religious, governmental, commercial, or familial bond – although there are fraternities dedicated to each of these fields of association.

On college campuses, fraternities may be divided into four different groups: social, service, professional, and honorary.

Fraternities can be organized for many purposes, including university education, work skills, ethics, ethnicity, religion, politics, charity, chivalry, other standards of personal conduct, asceticism, service, performing arts, family command of territory, and even crime. There is almost always an explicit goal of mutual support, and while there have been fraternal orders for the well-off there have also been many fraternities for those in the lower ranks of society, especially for national or religious minorities. Trade unions also grew out of fraternities such as the Knights of Labor.

The ability to organize freely, apart from the institutions of government and religion, was a fundamental part of the establishment of the modern world. In Living the Enlightenment, Margaret C. Jacobs showed that the development of Jurgen Habermas's "public space" in 17th-century Netherlands was closely related to the establishment of lodges of Freemasons.

Trade guilds

The development of fraternities in England can be traced from guilds that emerged as the forerunners of trade unions and friendly societies. These guilds were set up to protect and care for their members at a time when there was no welfare state, trade unions or universal health care. Various secret signs and handshakes were created to serve as proof of their membership allowing them to visit guilds in distant places that are associated with the guild they belong.

Over the next 300 years or so, the idea of "ordinary" people joining together to improve their situation met with varying degrees of opposition (and persecution) from "People in Power", depending on whether they were seen as a source of revenue (taxes) or a threat to their power. When Henry VIII broke from the Roman Catholic Church, he viewed the guilds as supporters of the Pope, and in 1545 expropriated them. Later, Elizabeth I appropriated apprenticeships away from guilds, and by the end of her reign most guilds had been suppressed.

The suppression of these trade guilds removed an important form of social and financial support from ordinary men and women.

Fraternal orders

In London and other major cities, some Guilds (like the Freemasons and the Odd Fellows) survived by adapting their roles to a social support function. Eventually, these groups evolved in the early 18th century into more philosophical organizations focused on brotherly love and ethical living, with some elements inspired by organisations such as chivalric orders. Among guilds that became prosperous are the Freemasons, Odd Fellows and Foresters.

University and college fraternities

Fraternities have a history in American colleges and universities and form a major subsection of the whole range of fraternities. In Europe, students were organized in nations and corporations since the beginnings of the modern university in the late medieval period, but the situation can differ greatly by country.

In the United States, fraternities in colleges date to the 1770s but did not fully assume an established pattern until the 1820s. Many were strongly influenced by the patterns set by Freemasonry. The main difference between the older European organizations and the American organizations is that the American student societies virtually always include initiations, the formal use of symbolism, and a lodge-based organizational structure (chapters).

The oldest active social American college fraternity is the Kappa Alpha Society founded in 1825 at Union College. Sigma Phi Society (1827) and Delta Phi Fraternity (1827) were founded at the same school and comprise the Union Triad. The women's fraternities, now more commonly referred to as sororities, formed beginning in 1851 with the establishment of Alpha Delta Pi as the first women's fraternity. 

Expansion to other schools, by way of approved chapters operating under a Charter or Warrant has been the model whereby US fraternities have grown nationally and into Canada. This resulted in the formation of national structures of governance where previously each nascent fraternity had been under the control of its first, often "Alpha" chapter. As fraternities grew larger they outpaced the capacity of volunteer management and began to employ staff, eventually requiring an administrative office. Today, hundreds of "National" fraternities account for roughly 15,000 active chapters. Some national groups remain quite small, with only a handful of active groups, while the largest will manage in excess of 300 active chapters. Alternatively, some fraternities remain as "Local" units, often retaining a literary society model that was more prevalent in the 19th Century. Fraternities offer a wide variety of services: National chapters and locals may or may not have buildings, and while many are residential, some have properties that are meeting halls only. Fraternities which provide residential space exhibit an array of services and sizes. Meals may be catered, or served by a full-time staff, but in other cases the members will cook their own meals. Maintenance is typically performed by members, although on some campuses the host institution handles capital improvements. Sorority chapters tend to be larger, with a business model that includes more formal maintenance and support. Properties may be independently owned by housing corporations, and in the case of some schools these will provide the bulk of residential options for undergraduates; these properties may be on leased or privately held land. Other chapters, often new chapters, are housed in dorms and meet in rented halls.

US Fraternities formed in roughly three waves.  The "old-line" fraternities are considered those that formed prior to, and during the American Civil War, all of which were Eastern or Southern. The next wave coincided with the period immediately after the Civil War until 1920, organizations normally modeled after the old-line fraternities.  After WWII, the most recent wave of formation has largely been on ethnic or multi-cultural lines, which continues today. Prior to the formation of the NIC, NPC and other associations, whole chapters or schismatic groups of members would occasionally break away to form new fraternities as an offshoot of a former national. These national associations were developed, in part, to prevent this practice.

The vast majority of US collegiate institutions recognize fraternities, ranging from a benign tolerance to active support. In Canada, fraternities are only rarely given official recognition, but rather, exist in the campus orbit as independent organizations. A few US campuses have historically banned fraternity participation, a position from which several have backtracked in the face of alumni criticism or ongoing student demand. For example, sororities (only) were banned at Stanford University in 1944 due to "extreme competition", but brought back in response to Title IX in 1977. Colby College, Amherst College, and a few others are the outliers, where these bans persist. The College of Wooster adopted a Greek ban 100 years ago, but fraternities and sororities there have continued as local organizations. In 2017 Harvard University attempted to ban single-sex clubs, a matter that was met with separate lawsuits in federal and Massachusetts courts. Often, Greek chapters that are suspended or banned will continue as sub rosa organizations.

Since at least the 1940s, US Fraternities have received increased scrutiny in the United States from incidents of hazing or racism that have received national attention, and on some campuses, such as Florida State, the organizations have been temporarily banned while administrators and national fraternities adjust to resolve these shared challenges. 

In Germany the German Student Corps are the oldest academic fraternities. Twenty-eight were founded in the 18th century and two of them still exist. Most of their traditions have not changed much for the past two centuries. These traditions include academic fencing duels with sharp blades while wearing only eye and neck protection, or regular hunting events, as can be seen in examples such as Corps Hubertia Freiburg, Corps Palatia Munich, Corps Rhenania Heidelberg or Corps Bavaria Munich.

At Swedish universities, especially those of Uppsala and Lund, students have organized in nations since the 16th century. These organizations are open to all students who wish to join. Parallel to the nations both Uppsala and Lund play host to a large number of university-related secret societies, for both students and older academics.

There are thriving collegiate fraternity systems in Puerto Rico and in the Philippines.

See also
 List of general fraternities
 List of social fraternities and sororities
 Professional fraternities and sororities
 Service fraternities and sororities
 Gentlemen's club
 Country club 
 Dining club
 Literary societies
 Order of Franciscan Friars Minor
 Student society
 Supper club

References

External links

 Kake Walk at UVM digital collection, Center for Digital Initiatives, University of Vermont Libraries